Lý Sơn, previously known as Cù Lao Ré, is an insular district of Quảng Ngãi province, lying off the South Central Coast of Vietnam.

Geography and geology
The main island, Lý Sơn (Cù Lao Ré) has three prominent craters, the largest of which is Mount Thoi Loi (Thới Lới). Hydrothermal waters on Lý Sơn provide heat for the local power plant. The secondary island is known as Little Island (Cù Lao Bờ Bãi) and is also well populated.

History
Remains of the pre-200 C.E. Sa Huỳnh culture have been found on the islands. The Cham used Ly Son as a transhipment base. Xó La well, one of the wells used to provide fresh water for ships, still remains on the shore of the main island and is still in use. The islands were used as a geographical landmark for navigation by Admiral Zheng He's crew during the 15th-century treasure voyages. In the 17th century the Nguyễn lords started a colony on the islands from An Vĩnh, Bình Sơn district, in Quảng Ngãi, as part of the activities of the Hoàng Sa Company's development of the Paracel Islands. During the United States involvement in the Vietnam War, Lý Sơn was the site of a U.S. Navy radar installation that was used to track shipping along the Vietnamese coast.

Economy
The economy was founded on, and remains, primarily based on seafood extraction. Lý Sơn is a major offshore fishing center with an output of 29,000 tonnes worth VND241.2 billion ($11.4 million) in 2012, accounting for almost one fourth of Quảng Ngãi's total.

Lý Sơn is also known throughout Vietnam for its production of a special variety of garlic, although coastal sand mining  to support its extensive cultivation has led to significant erosion.  In the 21st century Lý Sơn began to develop its tourist industry.

Tourism 
Lý Sơn island is well known for its number of scenic spots and freshly-served seafood among Vietnamese locals.

Here are the following tourism attractions:
 To Vo Gate (Cổng Tò Vò) 
 Mount Thoi Loi (Núi Thới Lới) 
 Hang Cave (Hang Câu)
 Garlic fields

Culture 

As in other parts of coastal Vietnam whales are important in local mythology and religion. Around one hundred whale skeletons are kept in temples, the largest and most important of which is in Tan Temple in An Hai Commune. According to a local legend, the 200-year-old skeleton are the remains of Nam Hai Dong Dinh Dai Vuong (the king of whales), the most powerful whale in the East Sea. Whale skeletons are worshiped and huge funerals are held when a stranded whale is found because they are believed to protect fishers while they are at sea.

Administrative divisions 
Lý Sơn district is a special district. It is not divided into administrative divisions.

Gallery

Notes

References
 Hardy, Andrew (2009): "Eaglewood and the Economic History of Champa and Central Vietnam" in Hardy, Andrew et al.: Champa and the Archeology of My Son (Vietnam). NUS Press, Singapore

Districts of Quảng Ngãi province
Islands of Vietnam
Landforms of Quảng Ngãi province